This is a list of nature centers and environmental education centers in the state of Oklahoma. 

To use the sortable tables: click on the icons at the top of each column to sort that column in alphabetical order; click again for reverse alphabetical order.

External links
 Map of nature centers and environmental education centers in Oklahoma

 
Nature centers
Oklahoma